The Kwajaha is the district center of the Tulak District in Ghor province, Afghanistan.

See also 
 List of cities in Afghanistan

References

Populated places in Ghor Province